Flor is a unisex given name and nickname. It may refer to:

 Flor Alpaerts (1876–1954), Belgian conductor, pedagogue and composer
 Flor Colón (born 1969), Dominican retired volleyball player
 Flor Contemplacion (1953–1995), Filipino domestic worker whose execution in Singapore for murder created much unrest
 Flor Delgadillo Ruiz (born 1973), Colombian road cyclist
 Flor Isava Fonseca (1921–2020), Venezuelan sportswoman and writer
 Flor Joosen (born 1952), Belgian businessman
Flor María Chalbaud (1921–2013), Venezuelan First Lady
 Flor Alba Núñez Vargas (1990–2015), murdered Colombian journalist
 Flor Peeters (1903–1986), Belgian composer, organist and teacher
 Flor Ruiz (born 1991), Colombian javelin thrower
 Flor Silvestre, stage name of Mexican singer, actress and equestrienne Guillermina Jiménez Chabolla (born 1930)
 Flor Velázquez (born 1984), Venezuelan judoka
 Flor (singer), Argentine pop and rock singer Florencia "Flor" Caserta (born 1984)
 Florus Flor Silvester (1923–2008), Dutch graphic designer, illustrator, painter and sculptor

See also
 Flore (given name)

Unisex given names